Richard Kihn (born 15 August 1935) is a Canadian gymnast. He competed in seven events at the 1964 Summer Olympics.

References

1935 births
Living people
Canadian male artistic gymnasts
Olympic gymnasts of Canada
Gymnasts at the 1964 Summer Olympics
People from Alzenau
Sportspeople from Lower Franconia